Hendrik Pieter Maarten Hijink (born 24 May 1983) is a Dutch politician who has been a Socialist Party member of the House of Representatives since 23 March 2017.

References 

1983 births
Living people
21st-century Dutch politicians
Members of the House of Representatives (Netherlands)
Socialist Party (Netherlands) politicians